The New York Jewels were an American basketball team based in New York, New York that was a member of the American Basketball League.

The team was previously known as the Brooklyn Jewels. For the 2nd half of the 1936/37, the team was renamed the Brooklyn Jewels. Before the 1937/38 season, the Brooklyn Jewels became the New Haven Jewels. During the 1st half of that season, the team moved back to New York on November 30, 1937. During the 1940/41 season, the team absorbed the Jersey Reds on January 26, 1940. The team dropped out during the 1st half of the 1941/42 season, but returned for the next season.

Year-by-year

Basketball teams in New York City
Defunct basketball teams in the United States